The 2021 Bahrain Ministry of Interior Tennis Challenger was a professional tennis tournament played on hard courts. It was the first edition of the tournament which was part of the 2021 ATP Challenger Tour. It took place in Manama, Bahrain between 22 and 28 November 2021.

Singles main-draw entrants

Seeds

 1 Rankings are as of 15 November 2021.

Other entrants
The following players received wildcards into the singles main draw:
  Hasan Abdulnabi
  Yankı Erel
  Iván Marrero Curbelo

The following player received entry into the singles main draw as an alternate:
  Mukund Sasikumar

The following players received entry from the qualifying draw:
  Marek Gengel
  Alexandar Lazarov
  Maximilian Neuchrist
  Vladyslav Orlov

The following player received entry into the singles main draw as a lucky loser:
  Johannes Härteis

Champions

Singles

  Ramkumar Ramanathan def.  Evgeny Karlovskiy 6–1, 6–4.

Doubles

  Nuno Borges /  Francisco Cabral def.  Maximilian Neuchrist /  Michail Pervolarakis 7–5, 6–7(5–7), [10–8].

References

2021 ATP Challenger Tour
2021 in Bahraini sport
November 2021 sports events in Asia